So This Is Love may refer to:

 "So This Is Love?" (song), by Van Halen
 "So This Is Love" (song), by The Future Sound of London (recording as Mental Cube)
 "So This Is Love", a song by Bobby Taylor & the Vancouvers
 "So This Is Love", a song by The Castells
 "So This Is Love", a song from the 1950 film Cinderella
 So This Is Love? (film), a 1928 silent film directed by Frank Capra
 So This Is Love (film) (aka The Grace Moore Story), a 1953 musical starring Kathryn Grayson

See also 
 This Is Love (disambiguation)